Medford Lakes is a borough in Burlington County, in the U.S. state of New Jersey. As of the 2020 United States census, the borough's population was 4,264, an increase of 118 (+2.8%) from the 2010 census count of 4,146, which in turn reflected a decline of 27 (−0.6%) from the 4,173 counted in the 2000 census.

Medford Lakes was incorporated as a borough by an act of the New Jersey Legislature on May 17, 1939, from portions of Medford Township. The borough was named for Medford Township, which was named by a developer for Medford, Massachusetts.

The borough's 22 lakes and surrounding lake communities are within the boundaries of the New Jersey Pinelands Commission. The Medford Lakes Colony, a homeowner association, manages the lakes and other recreational facilities. More than 10% of the borough's homes are log cabins.

History
Charles Read's Aetna Furnace contributed to the Continental Army's efforts during the American Revolutionary War, using local bog iron to manufacture cannonballs. A part of the industrial life of what is now Medford Lakes was the saw and grist mill erected by John Haines.

Medford Lakes was originally founded as resort community with a distinct architectural style, utilizing cedar logs as the primary building material. The logs were imported in large quantities and crafted into log cabins, with both the interior and exterior walls being made entirely of solid logs. Some of the logs were stripped of their bark while others were left in their natural state. The use of cedar as a building material was chosen due to its porous nature, which serves as an excellent insulator, thus allowing the cabins to remain cool in the summer and warm in the winter. The community also had an extended season, as the large stone fireplaces in the cabins could effectively heat the cabins during the colder months. The Medford Lakes Development Company was established in 1927 and in 1928, the Colony Club Pavilion was constructed on land donated by the Development Company.

St. Mary of the Lakes Catholic Church, a single-story log cabin structure built in 1931, was added to the National Register of Historic Places in 2007.

Medford Lakes was established as an independent municipality in 1939.

The borough experienced heavy damage on July 12, 2004, during a day that saw  of rainfall over a span of 14 hours. The heavy rain caused a series of dam breaks and breaches in the surrounding areas of Southern New Jersey, which have since been replaced. Quogue Dam, as well as both Lower and Upper Aetna Lake Dams failed, with high water levels on portions of Ballinger Run exceeding 500-year flood elevations.

Since 1931, a Canoe Carnival has been held during the first week of every August on Lower Aetna Lake.  Elaborate floats, built with a maximum of two canoes, are paddled by crowds gathered along the lake.  A winner is then named, along with a king, queen, and court.

Geography
According to the U.S. Census Bureau, the borough had a total area of 1.293 square miles (3.348 km2), including 1.162 square miles (3.008 km2) of which is land and 0.131 square miles (0.340 km2) of which is water (10.15%). The borough is an independent municipality surrounded entirely by Medford Township, making it part one of 21 pairs of "doughnut towns" in the state, where one municipality entirely surrounds another.

Medford Lakes is one of 56 South Jersey municipalities that are included within the New Jersey Pinelands National Reserve, a protected natural area of unique ecology covering , that has been classified as a United States Biosphere Reserve and established by Congress in 1978 as the nation's first National Reserve. All of the borough is included in the state-designated Pinelands Area, which includes portions of Burlington County, along with areas in Atlantic, Camden, Cape May, Cumberland, Gloucester and Ocean counties.

Climate

Demographics

2010 census

The Census Bureau's 2006−2010 American Community Survey showed that (in 2010 inflation-adjusted dollars) median household income was $101,086 (with a margin of error of +/− $8,928) and the median family income was $105,563 (+/− $9,949). Males had a median income of $85,139 (+/− $26,197) versus $66,379 (+/− $13,826) for females. The per capita income for the borough was $48,789 (+/− $6,097). About 5.0% of families and 5.6% of the population were below the poverty line, including 7.7% of those under age 18 and none of those age 65 or over.

2000 census
As of the 2000 United States census there were 4,173 people, 1,527 households, and 1,238 families residing in the borough. The racial makeup of the borough was 98.32% White, 0.43% African American, 0.12% Native American, 0.48% Asian, 0.10% from other races, and 0.55% from two or more races. Hispanic or Latino of any race were 0.98% of the population.

There were 1,527 households, out of which 36.3% had children under the age of 18 living with them, 70.8% were married couples living together, 7.6% had a female householder with no husband present, and 18.9% were non-families. 15.1% of all households were made up of individuals, and 6.0% had someone living alone who was 65 years of age or older. The average household size was 2.73 and the average family size was 3.04.

In the borough the age distribution of the population shows 25.6% under the age of 18, 5.0% from 18 to 24, 27.8% from 25 to 44, 29.2% from 45 to 64, and 12.4% who were 65 years of age or older. The median age was 40 years. For every 100 females, there were 95.9 males. For every 100 females age 18 and over, there were 92.4 males.

The median income for a household in the borough was $77,536, and the median income for a family was $83,695. Males had a median income of $58,854 versus $36,831 for females. The per capita income for the borough was $31,382. About 1.1% of families and 2.1% of the population were below the poverty line, including 1.1% of those under age 18 and 2.9% of those age 65 or over.

Government

Local government
The Borough of Medford Lakes is governed under the 1923 Municipal Manager Law form of New Jersey municipal government, one of seven municipalities (of the 564) statewide that use this form. The governing body is comprised of five members, who are elected at-large in non-partisan elections to serve four-year terms on a staggered basis, with either two or three seats up for vote in even-numbered years as part of the May municipal election. The borough council was expanded from three to five seats, with the two additional council seats added as part of the May 2010 election in which there were two seats up for a four-year term and two others for a two-year term.

, the Borough Council is comprised of Mayor Thomas J. Cranston (term of office  on council ends June 30, 2026; term as mayor ends 2024), Deputy Mayor Gary Miller (2024), Gail Caputo (2024), William R. Fields (2024) and Dennis O'Neill (2026).

In February 2021, the Borough Council appointed Dennis P. O'Neill to fill the seat expiring in June 2022 that had been held by Robert D. Hanold Sr. until his death the previous month. O'Neill served on an interim basis until the May 2021 municipal election, when he was elected to serve the balance of the term of office.

In March 2015, the Borough Council selected Kathy Merkh to fill the vacant seat of Deputy Mayor Jeff Fitzpatrick, who had submitted his resignation from office the previous month. Gary Miller was chosen to fill the vacant position of deputy mayor.

Federal, state and county representation
Medford Lakes is located in the 3rd Congressional District and is part of New Jersey's 8th state legislative district.

 

Burlington County is governed by a Board of County Commissioners comprised of five members who are chosen at-large in partisan elections to serve three-year terms of office on a staggered basis, with either one or two seats coming up for election each year; at an annual reorganization meeting, the board selects a director and deputy director from among its members to serve a one-year term. , Burlington County's Commissioners are
Director Felicia Hopson (D, Willingboro Township, term as commissioner ends December 31, 2024; term as director ends 2023),
Deputy Director Tom Pullion (D, Edgewater Park, term as commissioner and as deputy director ends 2023),
Allison Eckel (D, Medford, 2025),
Daniel J. O'Connell (D, Delran Township, 2024) and 
Balvir Singh (D, Burlington Township, 2023). 
Burlington County's Constitutional Officers are
County Clerk Joanne Schwartz (R, Southampton Township, 2023)
Sheriff James H. Kostoplis (D, Bordentown, 2025) and 
Surrogate Brian J. Carlin (D, Burlington Township, 2026).

Politics
As of March 2011, there were a total of 3,033 registered voters in Medford Lakes, of which 749 (24.7% vs. 33.3% countywide) were registered as Democrats, 1,009 (33.3% vs. 23.9%) were registered as Republicans and 1,275 (42.0% vs. 42.8%) were registered as Unaffiliated. There were no voters registered to other parties. Among the borough's 2010 Census population, 73.2% (vs. 61.7% in Burlington County) were registered to vote, including 99.2% of those ages 18 and over (vs. 80.3% countywide).

In the 2012 presidential election, Democrat Barack Obama received 1,197 votes here (49.3% vs. 58.1% countywide), ahead of Republican Mitt Romney with 1,194 votes (49.2% vs. 40.2%) and other candidates with 24 votes (1.0% vs. 1.0%), among the 2,429 ballots cast by the borough's 3,142 registered voters, for a turnout of 77.3% (vs. 74.5% in Burlington County). In the 2008 presidential election, Democrat Barack Obama received 1,223 votes here (49.3% vs. 58.4% countywide), ahead of Republican John McCain with 1,208 votes (48.7% vs. 39.9%) and other candidates with 34 votes (1.4% vs. 1.0%), among the 2,482 ballots cast by the borough's 3,007 registered voters, for a turnout of 82.5% (vs. 80.0% in Burlington County). In the 2004 presidential election, Republican George W. Bush received 1,302 votes here (52.0% vs. 46.0% countywide), ahead of Democrat John Kerry with 1,168 votes (46.6% vs. 52.9%) and other candidates with 24 votes (1.0% vs. 0.8%), among the 2,505 ballots cast by the borough's 3,014 registered voters, for a turnout of 83.1% (vs. 78.8% in the whole county).

In the 2013 gubernatorial election, Republican Chris Christie received 941 votes here (66.9% vs. 61.4% countywide), ahead of Democrat Barbara Buono with 425 votes (30.2% vs. 35.8%) and other candidates with 24 votes (1.7% vs. 1.2%), among the 1,406 ballots cast by the borough's 3,107 registered voters, yielding a 45.3% turnout (vs. 44.5% in the county). In the 2009 gubernatorial election, Republican Chris Christie received 956 votes here (55.8% vs. 47.7% countywide), ahead of Democrat Jon Corzine with 650 votes (37.9% vs. 44.5%), Independent Chris Daggett with 74 votes (4.3% vs. 4.8%) and other candidates with 17 votes (1.0% vs. 1.2%), among the 1,713 ballots cast by the borough's 3,061 registered voters, yielding a 56.0% turnout (vs. 44.9% in the county).

Education
Students in pre-kindergarten through eighth grade are educated by the Medford Lakes School District. As of the 2018–19 school year, the district, comprised of two schools, had an enrollment of 514 students and 43.0 classroom teachers (on an FTE basis), for a student–teacher ratio of 12.0:1. Schools in the district (with 2018–2019 enrollment data from the National Center for Education Statistics) are 
Nokomis School with 151 students in Pre-K to 2nd grade and 
Neeta School with 363 students in grades 3–8.

Public school students from Medford Lakes in ninth through twelfth grades attend Shawnee High School, located in Medford Township. Shawnee is part of the Lenape Regional High School District, a regional high school district in Burlington County, New Jersey that serves the eight municipalities of Evesham Township, Medford Lakes, Medford Township, Mount Laurel Township, Shamong Township, Southampton Township, Tabernacle Township and Woodland Township. As of the 2018–19 school year, the high school had an enrollment of 1,597 students and 127.0 classroom teachers (on an FTE basis), for a student–teacher ratio of 12.6:1.

Students from Medford Lakes, and from all of Burlington County, are eligible to attend the Burlington County Institute of Technology, a countywide public school district that serves the vocational and technical education needs of students at the high school and post-secondary level at its campuses in Medford and Westampton.

Transportation

The main roads serving Medford Lakes are County Route 532 and County Route 541. CR 541 travels north–south, while CR 532 head east from its western terminus at CR 541 within the borough.

Notable people

People who were born in, residents of, or otherwise closely associated with Medford Lakes include:

 Brian Earl, former professional basketball player who is the head coach for the Cornell Big Red men's basketball team
 Dan Earl (born 1974), head men's basketball coach for the VMI Keydets
 George Makris (1920–2005), 18th head coach of the Temple Owls football team
 Gregg Rakoczy (born 1965), NFL football player for the Cleveland Browns
 Liz Tchou (born 1966), former field hockey defender who played on the US women's team that finished fifth at the 1996 Summer Olympics in Atlanta

References

External links

 Medford Lakes website
 Burlington County webpage for Medford Lakes borough

 
1923 Municipal Manager Law
1939 establishments in New Jersey
Boroughs in Burlington County, New Jersey
Populated places established in 1939
Populated places in the Pine Barrens (New Jersey)